David Copeland (2 April 1875 – 1931) was a professional footballer who played for Ayr Parkhouse, Walsall Town Swifts, Bedminster, Tottenham Hotspur, Chelsea and Glossop North End.

Football career 
Copeland a forward played for his local team Ayr Parkhouse before joining Walsall Town Swifts in 1893 where he featured in 76 matches, scoring on 19 occasions. After playing for Bedminster in 1898–99, Copeland joined Tottenham Hotspur where he was a member of the 1901 FA Cup winning side. He moved on to Chelsea in 1905 and featured in 26 matches and finding the net nine times. Copeland ended his career at Glossop North End where he made a further two appearances.

Honours 
Tottenham Hotspur
 1899-1900: Southern League Winner
 1901 FA Cup Final–Winner

External links
First match at White Hart Lane Retrieved 11 March 2009

References

1875 births
1931 deaths
Footballers from Ayr
Scottish footballers
Walsall F.C. players
Bedminster F.C. players
Tottenham Hotspur F.C. players
Chelsea F.C. players
Glossop North End A.F.C. players
Southern Football League players
English Football League players
Association football forwards
FA Cup Final players